Ayit Tzavua (Hebrew: עיט צבוע), literally The Painted Eagle,  or The Hypocrite  is an 1858 Hebrew novel by Abraham Mapu. The novel is partly set in the salon of a Lithuanian magnate, in which enlightened Poles and Jews meet and discuss Voltaire, philosophy and the Jews. It is one of the first modern novels in Hebrew, following the same author's Ahavat Zion (1853).

References

1858 novels
Hebrew-language novels